"One More Time" is a song by the French electronic music duo Daft Punk, released as a single from their second studio album, Discovery (2001), on 13 November 2000. It is a French house song featuring a stylistically Auto-Tuned vocal performance by Romanthony. The music video forms part of the 2003 anime film, Interstella 5555: The 5tory of the 5ecret 5tar 5ystem. "One More Time" reached number one on the French Singles Chart, number two on the UK Singles Chart, and number 61 on the US Billboard Hot 100.

The Village Voices Pazz & Jop annual year-end critics' poll named "One More Time" one of the best songs of the year. It was named one of the greatest songs of the decade by Pitchfork, and Rolling Stone named it one of "The 500 Greatest Songs of All Time". Mixmag readers voted it the greatest dance record of all time. In 2007, FSN Southwest used the song in their postgame closing montage after the Spurs won the NBA Finals.

Composition
Daft Punk considered "One More Time" the link connecting Homework to Discovery. The song was completed as early as the beginning of 1998, where it remained "sitting on a shelf" until its eventual release on 13 November 2000. It prominently features a vocal performance written and sung by Romanthony. As stated by Guy-Manuel de Homem-Christo, "we thought the funkiness of his voice fit the funkiness of the music."

The song was considered an example of French house's frequent use of audio filters, featuring heavily processed auto-tuned vocals. When questioned on the effects, Thomas Bangalter stated "A lot of people complain about musicians using Auto-Tune. It reminds me of the late '70s when musicians in France tried to ban the synthesizer... What they didn't see was that you could use those tools in a new way instead of just for replacing the instruments that came before." According to Bangalter, Romanthony enjoyed the alterations to his vocal on the track. "He has done a lot of different things and he always tries to innovate, which is what we like to do on our records. He never had his voice treated like an instrument like that." He also elaborated:

The album version of the track includes a two-minute breakdown. Bangalter remarked that, "The break is so long it's not even the break. The song itself is the breakdown."

Sampling 
"One More Time" contains a sample of the 1979 disco song "More Spell on You" by Eddie Johns, which is uncredited in the Discovery liner notes. Johns, who has been destitute for decades, did not receive royalties for the sample. A representative for Daft Punk confirmed the use of the sample and that they continued to pay royalties to GM Musipro, the French publishing company that has owned rights to "More Spell on You" since 1995. A representative of GM Musipro said they had never been able to locate Johns, and that they would follow up on the matter after an investigation by the Los Angeles Times in 2021. The music industry attorney Erin Jacobson said it was common for rights owners to be untraceable. She estimated that Johns could be owed a sum "in the high six-to-seven-figure range" based on streams alone.

Release
The single contains an eight-minute version of "One More Time" featuring extended vocals absent from the album version. An "unplugged" rendition was included in the remix album Daft Club. The remix album contains a remix of "Aerodynamic" by Daft Punk featuring elements of "One More Time". The "short radio edit" of "One More Time" from the single was later included in the compilation album Musique Vol. 1 1993–2005. Daft Punk performed "One More Time" on their Alive 2006/2007 tour; a performance was included on the live album Alive 2007.

Use in other works 
"One More Time" was sampled and incorporated in Miliyah Kato's song "Future Lover -Mirai Koibito-" in January 2016. The song peaked at number 30 in Japan. The track was also sampled and interpolated in the Drake and 21 Savage song "Circo Loco" on their album, Her Loss (2022); however, the sample was heavily criticized by critics, with Paul A. Thompson of Pitchfork describing the song as having a "hammily stupid Daft Punk flip", while Josh Svetz of Paste wrote that the song's "worst crime is butchering Daft Punk's classic "One More Time"."

Music video
The music video features scenes that would later form part of Interstella 5555: The 5tory of the 5ecret 5tar 5ystem, a 2003 anime film that acts as a visual  of Discovery. The video features a pop band of humanoid blue-skinned aliens performing the song to a crowd on their home planet while a mysterious force approaches it. Like the rest of the feature film, it was directed by Kazuhisa Takenouchi under the visual supervision of Leiji Matsumoto.

Chart performance
In both Daft Punk's native France and Canada, "One More Time" topped the national singles charts. In the United States, "One More Time" peaked at number 61 on the Billboard Hot 100 (tying with previous Daft Punk hit, "Around the World"); by June 2013 it had sold 1,052,000 digital copies there, and became Daft Punk's first million-seller. "One More Time" peaked at number one on the dance chart in the same country. On the Eurochart Hot 100 Singles chart, the song debuted at number one, one of the few songs to do so.

In the United Kingdom, "One More Time" peaked at number two on the UK Singles Chart, Daft Punk's highest-charting single in the country until "Get Lucky" reached number one in 2013; the song also topped the dance chart. It was also a hit in Australia, debuting at number 46 and peaking at number 10. It thus became Daft Punk's most successful song in Australia until "Get Lucky", the first single from their 2013 album Random Access Memories, topped the ARIA chart in 2013.

Reception 
"One More Time" was listed at number five on Pitchforks top 500 songs of the 2000s, with the magazine writing that it "distill[s] 25 years of pop and house into five and a half minutes of first-time joy." Rolling Stone listed it at number 33 of their top 100 songs of the decade (2000–2009) as well as number 307 on its amended "The 500 Greatest Songs of All Time" list in May 2010. It was voted by Mixmag readers as the greatest dance record of all time. Also, "One More Time" was ranked at number 11 on The Village Voices Pazz & Jop annual year-end critics' poll. In 2021, Billboard ranked the song number one on its list of the 20 greatest Daft Punk songs.

Track listing

Charts and certifications

Weekly charts

Year-end charts

Certifications

References

External links
 
 Virgin Records Daft Punk official website
 Official Musique Vol.1 website (contains recording date info)

2000 singles
2000 songs
Animated music videos
Canadian Singles Chart number-one singles
Daft Punk songs
European Hot 100 Singles number-one singles
Number-one singles in Portugal
SNEP Top Singles number-one singles
Songs about dancing
Songs about music
Songs written by Guy-Manuel de Homem-Christo
Songs written by Thomas Bangalter
Virgin Records singles